The 1998 Women's Australian Hockey League (AHL) was the 6th edition of the women's field hockey tournament. The tournament was held in various cities across Australia, and was contested from 25 June through to 18 July 1999.

NSW Arrows won the tournament for the third time after defeating QLD Scorchers 4–3 in the final. WAIS Diamonds finished in third place after defeating ACT Strikers 3–2 in the third and fourth place playoff.

Participating teams

 ACT Strikers
 NSW Arrows
 QLD Scorchers
 Adelaide Suns
 Tassie Van Demons
 VIS Vipers
 WAIS Diamonds

Results

Preliminary round

Pool

Fixtures

Classification round

Semi-finals

Third and fourth place

Final

Awards

Statistics

Final standings

References

External links
Hockey Australia

1998
1998 in Australian women's field hockey